YSP may refer to:

Yemeni Socialist Party
Yield spread premium, a cash rebate paid by a lender to a mortgage broker if the broker sells a mortgage at an above-Par interest rate to a borrower
Yorkshire Sculpture Park, in Yorkshire, England
FSU Young Scholars Program, a residential science and mathematics program in Florida
Marathon Aerodrome (IATA code), in Marathon, Ontario, Canada
Yale shooting problem, a situational logic conundrum formulated at Yale University